Miguel Amezcua Alejo (born 18 May 1968) is a Mexican politician affiliated with the Institutional Revolutionary Party. As of 2014 he served as Deputy of the LIX Legislature of the Mexican Congress representing Michoacán.

References

1968 births
Living people
Politicians from Michoacán
Institutional Revolutionary Party politicians
21st-century Mexican politicians
Deputies of the LIX Legislature of Mexico
Members of the Chamber of Deputies (Mexico) for Michoacán